Matthew Mahoney (born 12 December 1968) is a former Australian rules footballer who played with Melbourne Football Club in the Australian Football League (AFL).

Mahoney started his career with Eastlake Football Club in the Australian Capital Territory, as a ruckman. He was selected by Melbourne with Pick 69 for the 1988 VFL Draft. He played four games in the 1990 AFL season. His other two appearances both came in the 1992 season. Matthew was known for a long standing feud with Essendon champion Mark Harvey.

References

External links
 
 

1968 births
Australian rules footballers from the Australian Capital Territory
Eastlake Football Club players
Living people
Melbourne Football Club players
Place of birth missing (living people)